Uhm Ji-won (born December 25, 1977) is a South Korean actress.

Career 
Uhm Ji-won  made her acting debut in the late 1990s, and after an early role in the Korean tokusatsu series Vectorman, went on to appear in a number of films and television drama series. In 2004, she appeared alongside Han Suk-kyu and Lee Eun-ju in The Scarlet Letter, receiving a nomination for Best Supporting Actress at the Blue Dragon Film Awards.

In 2005, Uhm played a leading role in Hong Sang-soo's Tale of Cinema, and was praised for giving an "engaging, emotionally nuanced dual performance" as fictional actress Choi Young-shil. The film required her to perform her first nude scene, and she later remarked that, "After stripping in front of the camera, I felt that I could now take any role."

Uhm starred alongside Yoo Ji-tae and Kim Ji-soo in the 2006 film Traces of Love, portraying a survivor of the 1995 Sampoong Department Store collapse who still suffers from psychological trauma years later. She prepared for the role by studying news and documentaries of the event, as well as reading through various psychology texts. Uhm was once again nominated for Best Supporting Actress at the Blue Dragon Film Awards, and later won the same category at the Chunsa Film Art Awards.

After a cameo in director Kim Jee-woon's 2008 epic western The Good, the Bad, the Weird, and a leading role in another Hong Sang-soo art film Like You Know It All, she was cast in her first period film, Private Eye. Uhm returned to lighter fare in 2010 with the romantic comedy series The Woman Who Still Wants to Marry.

In 2011, Uhm appeared an episode of BBC World's The Third Eye, a documentary series that spotlights up-and-coming countries. The installment of the eight-part segment on Korea is interspersed with interviews with Uhm giving her opinions on Korean culture, domestic movies and the Korean Wave. It also featured footage from her 2010 sex comedy movie Foxy Festival. Uhm, who was interviewed in Korea, was chosen in light of her impressive acting skills, natural charm and English fluency, producers said.

From 2012 to 2013, she starred in family dramas by renowned TV writer Kim Soo-hyun, Childless Comfort and Thrice Married Woman. This was followed by a well-received supporting performance in the gangster comedy Man on the Edge.

Uhm then played the mother of a sexually assaulted child in Hope; she said it was the first movie where she let go of everything, calling it one of her best works. Uhm won Best Actress at the Korean Association of Film Critics Awards, and received nominations at the Blue Dragon Film Awards and the Baeksang Arts Awards. This was followed by period mystery-thriller The Silenced, and fantasy thriller The Phone. This was followed by kidnapping drama Missing, which won her Best Actress award at the Women in Film Korea Awards. Uhm then featured in crime action film Master.

In 2017, Uhm made a small-screen comeback in SBS' legal thriller Distorted, playing a public prosecutor.

In 2019, Uhm starred in the body-swap comedy drama Spring Turns to Spring. The same year, she starred in the zombie comedy film The Odd Family: Zombie On Sale.

In May 2019, Uhm signed with new agency C-JeS Entertainment.

Personal life
Uhm is a member of Yeongwol Eom clan.

Uhm is a devout Protestant Christian, and together with Han Hye-jin was part of a church group called HaMiMo.

Uhm began dating architect Oh Young-wook in 2013; Oh is the founder of well-known architectural firm ogisadesign d'espacio architects (oddaa), and has also published several books on travel and art. They married on May 27, 2014 at the Shilla Hotel in Seoul.

Later on April 6, 2021 Uhm announced on her YouTube channel that she had divorced her husband who was an architect by reducing the level to just friends.

Philanthropy 
On March 12, 2022, Uhm made a donation  millions to the Hope Bridge Disaster Relief Association to help the victims of the massive wildfire that started in Uljin, Gyeongbuk and has spread to Samcheok, Gangwon.

On March 17, 2022 Uhm made a donation  millions to Save the Children's Children's Rights Film to help victims of the Ukrainian-Russian war.

Filmography

Film

Television series

Web series

Variety show

Music video

Musical theatre

Awards and nominations

References

External links 

 
 
  
 
 Uhm Ji-won Fan Cafe at Daum 
 
 

20th-century South Korean actresses
21st-century South Korean actresses
South Korean film actresses
South Korean television actresses
South Korean musical theatre actresses
1977 births
Living people
People from Daegu
Yeongwol Eom clan
Kyungpook National University alumni
South Korean Protestants